Saturdays is an upcoming American coming-of-age comedy television series created by Norman Vance Jr. It is set to premiere on March 24, 2023 on Disney Channel. The series stars Danielle Jalade, Daria Johns, Golden Brooks, Omar Gooding, Jermaine Harris, Peyton Basnight, and Tim Johnson Jr.

Premise
Paris Johnson (a 14-year-old girl) forms the "We-B-Girlz" skate crew with her best friends: Simone and Ari. Together, they are determined to create the hottest skate routines in their local roller rink "Saturday's" and are working to become famous in Chicago, Illinois.

Cast

Main
 Danielle Jalade as Paris Johnson, the protagonist.
 Daria Johns as Simone Samson, Paris' best friend.
 Golden Brooks as Deb Johnson, Paris' mother.
 Omar Gooding as Cal Johnson, Paris' father.
 Jermaine Harris as London Johnson, Paris' older brother.
 Peyton Basnight as Ari Stevens, Paris' best friend.
 Tim Johnson Jr. as Derek Troy, London's best friend.

Production
On March 11, 2021, Disney Channel gave a pilot order to Saturdays. Marsai Martin and Norman Vance Jr. serve as executive producers. Vance also served as the writer of the pilot. On November 30, 2021, the series was formally greenlit. Production began on May 2, 2022 in Chicago, Illinois and wrapped in mid-September that same year. On April 7, 2022, Tim Johnson Jr. and Peyton Basnight joined the cast as series regulars. On February 9, 2023, it was announced that the series would premiere on March 24, 2023.

Episodes

Release
Saturdays is scheduled to be released on March 24, 2023 on Disney Channel. The first six episodes will be released on Disney+ on March 25, 2023.

References

External links 
 
 

2020s American children's comedy television series
2023 American television series debuts
Disney Channel original programming
English-language television shows
Television shows set in Chicago
Upcoming comedy television series